The Lysine riboswitch is a metabolite binding RNA element found within certain messenger RNAs that serve as a precision sensor for the amino acid lysine. Allosteric rearrangement of mRNA structure is mediated by ligand binding, and this results in modulation of gene expression. Lysine riboswitch are most abundant in Bacillota and Gammaproteobacteria where they are found upstream of a number of genes involved in lysine biosynthesis, transport and catabolism. The lysine riboswitch has also been identified independently and called the L box.

Structure
The structure of the lysine riboswitch has recently been determined. The lysine amino acid is bound in the pocket formed by the 5-way junction.  The structure is composed of a three helical bundle and a two helical bundle joined by the 5-way junction.  Helices 1 and 2 are stacked in a colinear fashion as are helices 4 and 5.

References

External links 
 
 PDB entry for the lysine riboswitch tertiary structure

Cis-regulatory RNA elements
Riboswitch